José Javier Cortez Arroyo (born 5 May 1995) is an Ecuadorian footballer who currently plays as a forward for Zacatepec.

Career statistics

Club

Notes

References

1995 births
Living people
Ecuadorian footballers
Ecuadorian expatriate footballers
Association football forwards
Ecuadorian Serie A players
Liga MX players
Club Atlético Zacatepec players
Ecuadorian expatriate sportspeople in Mexico
Expatriate footballers in Mexico